Mitty, Guinea  is a town and sub-prefecture in the Dalaba Prefecture in the Mamou Region of western Guinea.

References

Sub-prefectures of the Mamou Region